Jorge Calandrelli is an Argentinian-born composer, arranger and conductor known for his work with Barbra Streisand, Celine Dion, Arturo Sandoval, Yo-Yo Ma, Tony Bennett, Elton John, Lady Gaga and John Legend. He has won 6 Grammy Awards and has received 28 nominations. He won the Latin Grammy Award for Producer of the Year and Best Instrumental Album for his work on A Time for Love by Arturo Sandoval in 2010.

Calandrelli has been nominated twice for an Academy Award for his work on The Color Purple and Crouching Tiger, Hidden Dragon.

Early life and career 
Calandrelli's mother was a skilled pianist. Both his father and grandfather were medical doctors and expected him to follow their path. At age 4, Calandrelli started playing the piano by ear and took lessons at age 8.

In his late teens, with both of his parents' support, Calandrelli traveled to Europe to pursue a career in music. He arrived in Los Angeles in 1968 and collaborated with composer and arranger Clare Fischer. Inspired by him, Calandrelli decided to go back to Argentina and continue honing his skills.

He later returned to the United States with recommendation letters from the record labels he had worked with in Argentina. He recorded Russian-American conductor Andre Kostelanetz and a 65-piece orchestra at CBS' studio in New York.

Calandrelli started arranging for different artists, achieving wider recognition in 1981 with first Grammy Award nomination for Best Instrumental Arrangement for his work on "Forget the Woman" by Eddie Daniels. In 1987, he was nominated three times at the 29th Grammy Awards: in the Best Arrangement on an Instrumental category for "Solfeggietto/Metamorphosis" by Eddie Daniels and "The First Letter" from The Color Purple soundtrack and in the Best Instrumental Arrangement Accompanying Vocals category for Tony Bennett's version of Daniels' "Forget The Woman ".

Calandrelli's work with Bennett includes twelve recorded albums, six Grammy Nominations and two Grammy Awards won. Bennett's 2011 album "Duets II", arranged and conducted by Calandrelli debuted at No. 1 on the Billboard 200, Jazz Albums and Traditional Jazz Albums charts. This same No. 1 debut was achieved by Bennett's 2014 collaborative album with Lady Gaga "Cheek to Cheek", also arranged and orchestrated by Calandrelli.

He has arranged and conducted on eight Barbra Streisand albums, including "A Love Like Ours", "Timeless: Live in Concert", "The Christmas Collection" and "Walls". He is also credited on four Celine Dion albums, including "A New Day Has Come" and "One Heart". His work with cellist Yo-Yo Ma has earned him two Grammy Awards and three nominations.

Calandrelli produced, played the piano, composed, arranged and conducted Plácido Domingo's 2008 album "Amore Infinito", based on lyrics by Pope John Paul II. The album contains duets by Josh Groban, Katherine Jenkins, Andrea Bocelli, Vanessa Williams and Plácido Domingo Jr. 

Calandrelli is credited as arranger on the 2022 album "Fifty" by The Manhattan Transfer featuring the WDR Funkhausorchester. The album has been nominated for Best Jazz Vocal Album at the 65th Annual Grammy Awards.

Awards

Golden Score Awards 
The American Society of Music Arrangers and Composers (ASMAC) honored Calandrelli with the 2014 Golden Score Award for Arranging.

Academy Awards 
Calandrelli has been nominated twice for the Academy Award for his work on The Color Purple, directed by Steven Spielberg, and Crouching Tiger, Hidden Dragon, directed by Ang Lee

Latin Grammy Awards

Grammy Awards

References

External links

Year of birth missing (living people)
Argentine music arrangers
Argentine composers
Grammy Award winners
Latin Grammy Award for Producer of the Year
Place of birth missing (living people)
Living people
Latin music composers
Latin music record producers